Drassodella is a genus of African araneomorph spiders in the family Gallieniellidae, and was first described by John Hewitt in 1916. Originally placed with the ground spiders, it was moved to the Gallieniellidae in 1990.

Species
 it contains nineteen species, all found in South Africa:
Drassodella amatola Mbo & Haddad, 2019 – South Africa
Drassodella aurostriata Mbo & Haddad, 2019 – South Africa
Drassodella baviaans Mbo & Haddad, 2019 – South Africa
Drassodella flava Mbo & Haddad, 2019 – South Africa
Drassodella guttata Mbo & Haddad, 2019 – South Africa
Drassodella lotzi Mbo & Haddad, 2019 – South Africa
Drassodella maculata Mbo & Haddad, 2019 – South Africa
Drassodella melana Tucker, 1923 – South Africa
Drassodella montana Mbo & Haddad, 2019 – South Africa
Drassodella purcelli Tucker, 1923 – South Africa
Drassodella quinquelabecula Tucker, 1923 – South Africa
Drassodella salisburyi Hewitt, 1916 (type) – South Africa
Drassodella septemmaculata (Strand, 1909) – South Africa
Drassodella tenebrosa Lawrence, 1938 – South Africa
Drassodella tolkieni Mbo & Haddad, 2019 – South Africa
Drassodella transversa Mbo & Haddad, 2019 – South Africa
Drassodella trilineata Mbo & Haddad, 2019 – South Africa
Drassodella vasivulva Tucker, 1923 – South Africa
Drassodella venda Mbo & Haddad, 2019 – South Africa

References

Endemic fauna of South Africa
Araneomorphae genera
Gallieniellidae
Spiders of South Africa